Byberry is an extinct town in Cooper County, in the U.S. state of Missouri.

A post office called Byberry was established in 1890, and remained in operation until 1914. The community derives its name from William Berry, an early settler.

References

Ghost towns in Missouri
Former populated places in Cooper County, Missouri